The Rohan Master is the name given to an anonymous French book illuminator active in the first half of the 15th century, after his main work, the Rohan Hours. He also produced the Hours of Isabella Stuart.

Further reading 
 Meiss, Millard and Thomas, Marcel.  The Rohan Master: A Book of Hours.  George Braziller, New York, 1973.  

Manuscript illuminators
15th century in the arts
15th-century artists
15th-century French artists